Siemz-Niendorf is a municipality in the Nordwestmecklenburg district, in Mecklenburg-Vorpommern, Germany. It was created with effect from 26 May 2019 by the merger of the former municipalities of Groß Siemz and Niendorf.

References

Nordwestmecklenburg